This is a timeline documenting events and facts about English-language stand-up comedy in the year 2021.

January 
 January 10: Tig Notaro's special Drawn on HBO.
 January 12: Chris Rock's special Total Blackout: The Tamborine Extended Cut on Netflix.

February 
 February 2: K-Von's special Women Can Make Anything An Insult on Dry Bar Comedy.
 February 20: Ed Hill's special Candy and Smiley on Comedy Dynamics.
 February 21: Rose Matafeo's special Horndog on BBC Three and BBC iPlayer.
 February 23: Brian Regan's special On the Rocks on Netflix.

March 
 March 5: James Acaster's specials Cold Lasagne Hate Myself 1999 and Make a New Tomorrow on Vimeo.
 March 9: Fern Brady's special Power & Chaos on BBC Three and BBC iPlayer.
 March 16: RebellComedy: Straight Outta the Zoo on Netflix.
 March 18: Nate Bargatze's special The Greatest Average American on Netflix.
 March 23: Loyiso Gola's special Unlearning on Netflix.

May 
 May 8: Dylan Moran's special Dr Cosmos live-streamed on DICE.
 May 14: Simon Bird's special Debrief on All 4.
 May 27: Soy Rada's special Serendipity on Netflix.
 May 30: Bo Burnham's special Inside on Netflix.

June 
 June 3: Alan Saldaña's special Locked Up on Netflix.
 June 3: Josh Johnson's special #(Hashtag) on Comedy Central.

July  
 July 9: Lee Su-geun's special The Sense Coach on Netflix.

August 
 August 10: Phil Wang's special Philly Philly Wang Wang on Netflix.
 August 12: Lokillo's special Nothing’s the Same on Netflix.
 August 19: Marlon Wayans's special You Know What It Is on HBO Max.
 August 31: Drew Lynch's special Concussed on YouTube chanel.

September 
 September 7: Shane Gillis's special Live In Austin on gillyandkeeves.tv.
 September 17: Bill Bailey's special Larks in Transit on BBC One and BBC iPlayer.
 September 27: Jo Firestone's special Good Timing With Jo Firestone on Peacock.

October 
 October 5: Dave Chappelle's special The Closer on Netflix.
 October 14: One Night in Paris on Netflix.
 October 19: Theo Von's special Regular People on Netflix.
 October 23: Ricky Velez's special Here's Everything on HBO.
 October 27: Haroun on Netflix.
 October 29: Roy Wood Jr.'s special Imperfect Messenger on Comedy Central.

November 
 November 4: Aida Rodriguez's special Fighting Words on HBO Max.
 November 5: Joyelle Nicole Johnson's special Love Joy on Peacock.
 November 16: Michael Che's special Shame the Devil on Netflix.
 November 18: Carlos Ballarta's special False Prophet on Netflix.
 November 23: The Jonas Brothers Family Roast on Netflix.
 November 30: Mo Amer's special Mohammed in Texas on Netflix.

December 
 December 4: Drew Michael's special Red Blue Green on HBO Max.
 December 7: Nicole Byer's special BBW (Big Beautiful Weirdo) on Netflix.
 December 8: Carolin Kebekus's special The Last Christmas Special on Netflix.
 December 18: Louis C.K.'s special SORRY on his website.
 December 21: Jim Gaffigan's special Comedy Monster on Netflix.
 December 25: Jimmy Carr's special His Dark Material on Netflix.

See also 
 List of stand-up comedians
 List of Netflix original stand-up comedy specials

References 

Stand-up comedy
Stand-up comedy
2020s in comedy
Stand-up comedy
Culture-related timelines by year